Bernadette Peters (née Lazzara; born February 28, 1948) is an American actress, singer, and children's book author. Over a career spanning more than six decades, she has starred in musical theatre, television and film, performed in solo concerts and released recordings. She is a critically acclaimed Broadway performer, having received seven nominations for Tony Awards, winning two (plus an honorary award), and nine Drama Desk Award nominations, winning three. Four of the Broadway cast albums on which she has starred have won Grammy Awards.

Regarded by many as the foremost interpreter of the works of Stephen Sondheim, Peters is particularly noted for her roles on the Broadway stage, including in the musicals Mack and Mabel (1974), Sunday in the Park with George (1984), Song and Dance (1985), Into the Woods (1987), The Goodbye Girl (1993), Annie Get Your Gun (1999), Gypsy (2003), A Little Night Music (2010), Follies (2011), and Hello, Dolly! (2018).

Peters first performed on the stage as a child and then a teenaged actress in the 1960s, and in film and television in the 1970s. She was praised for this early work and for appearances on, among other programs, The Muppet Show and The Carol Burnett Show, and for her roles in films including Silent Movie, The Jerk, Pennies from Heaven and Annie. In the 1980s, she returned to the theatre, where she became one of the best-known Broadway stars over the next three decades. She also has recorded six solo albums and several singles, as well as many cast albums, and performs regularly in her own solo concert act. Peters continues to act on stage, in films and on television in such series as Smash and Mozart in the Jungle. She has been nominated for four Emmy Awards and three Golden Globe Awards, winning once.

Early life and career
Peters was born into a Sicilian-American family in Ozone Park in the New York City borough of Queens, the youngest of three children. Her mother, Marguerite (née Maltese), started her in show business by putting her on the television show Juvenile Jury at the age of three and a half. Her father, Peter Lazzara, drove a bread delivery truck. Her siblings are casting director Donna DeSeta and Joseph Lazzara. She appeared on the television shows Name That Tune and several times on The Horn and Hardart Children's Hour at age five.

In January 1958, at age nine, she obtained her Actors Equity Card in the name Bernadette Peters to avoid ethnic typecasting, with the stage name taken from her father's first name. She made her professional stage debut the same month in This Is Goggle, a comedy directed by Otto Preminger that closed during out-of-town tryouts before reaching New York. She then appeared on NBC television as Anna Stieman in A Boy Called Ciske, a Kraft Mystery Theatre production, in May 1958, and in a vignette entitled "Miracle in the Orphanage", part of "The Christmas Tree", a Hallmark Hall of Fame production, in December 1958, with fellow child actor Richard Thomas and veteran actors Jessica Tandy and Margaret Hamilton. She first appeared on the New York stage at age 10 as Tessie in the New York City Center revival of The Most Happy Fella (1959). In her teen years, she attended Quintano's School for Young Professionals, a now-defunct private school.

At age 13, Peters appeared as one of the "Hollywood Blondes" and was an understudy for "Dainty June" in the second national tour of Gypsy. During this tour, Peters first met her long-time accompanist, conductor and arranger Marvin Laird, who was the assistant conductor for the tour. Laird recalled, "I heard her sing an odd phrase or two and thought, 'God that's a big voice out of that little girl'". The next summer, she played Dainty June in summer stock, and in 1962 she recorded her first single. In 1964, she played Liesl in The Sound of Music and Jenny in Riverwind in summer stock at the Mt. Gretna Playhouse (Pennsylvania), and Riverwind again at the Bucks County Playhouse in 1966. Upon graduation from high school, she started working steadily, appearing Off-Broadway in the musicals The Penny Friend (1966) and Curley McDimple (1967) and as a standby on Broadway in The Girl in the Freudian Slip (1967). She made her Broadway debut in Johnny No-Trump in 1967, and next appeared as George M. Cohan's sister Josie opposite Joel Grey in George M! (1968), winning the Theatre World Award.

Peters's performance as "Ruby" in the 1968 Off-Broadway production of Dames at Sea, a parody of 1930s musicals, brought her critical acclaim and her first Drama Desk Award. She had appeared in an earlier 1966 version of Dames at Sea at the Off-Off-Broadway performance club Caffe Cino. Peters had starring roles in her next Broadway vehicles—Gelsomina in the 1969 musical version of the Italian film of the same name, La Strada (for which she won good reviews but the show closed after one performance) and Hildy in a revival of On the Town (1971), for which she received her first Tony Award nomination. She played Mabel Normand in Mack and Mabel (1974), receiving another Tony nomination. Clive Barnes wrote: "With the splashy Mack & Mabel ... diminutive and contralto Bernadette Peters found herself as a major Broadway star." The Mack and Mabel cast album became popular among musical theatre fans. She moved to Los Angeles in the early 1970s to concentrate on television and film work.

Film appearances

Peters has appeared in 33 feature films or television films beginning in 1973, including the 1976 Mel Brooks film Silent Movie (for which she was nominated for a Golden Globe Award), the musical Annie (1982), Pink Cadillac (1989), in which she co-starred with Clint Eastwood, and Woody Allen's Alice (1990).

Peters starred opposite Steve Martin in The Jerk (1979), in a role that he wrote for her, and again in Pennies from Heaven (1981), for which she won the Golden Globe Award as Best Motion Picture Actress in a Comedy or Musical.  In Pennies from Heaven, she played Eileen Everson, a schoolteacher turned prostitute. Of her performance in Pennies From Heaven, John DiLeo wrote that she "is not only poignant as you'd expect but has a surprising inner strength." Pauline Kael wrote in The New Yorker: "Peters is mysteriously right in every nuance."

Peters appeared with three generations of the Kirk Douglas family in the 2003 film It Runs in the Family, in which she played the wife of Michael Douglas's character. In May 2006, she appeared in the film Come le formiche (Wine and Kisses) with F. Murray Abraham, filmed in Italy, playing a rich American who becomes involved with an Italian family that owns a vineyard. The DVD was released in 2007 in Italy. She starred in a 2012 film titled Coming Up Roses, playing a former musical comedy actress with two daughters.

Return to theatre and Broadway success
In 1982, Peters returned to the New York stage after an eight-year absence, in one of her few non-musical stage appearances, the Off-Broadway Manhattan Theatre Club production of the comedy-drama Sally and Marsha, for which she was nominated for a Drama Desk Award. She then returned to Broadway as Dot/Marie in the Stephen Sondheim–James Lapine musical Sunday in the Park with George in 1984, for which she received her third Tony Award nomination. The New York Times theatre critic Frank Rich called her performance "radiant". She recorded the role for PBS in 1986, winning a 1987 ACE Award. Her next role was Emma in Andrew Lloyd Webber's Song and Dance on Broadway in 1985, winning her first Tony Award for Best Leading Actress in a Musical. Frank Rich wrote in an otherwise negative review of the show that Peters "has no peer in the musical theater right now."

She then created the role of the Witch in Sondheim-Lapine's Into the Woods (1987). Peters is "considered by many to be the premier interpreter of [Sondheim's] work," according to writer Alex Witchel. Raymond Knapp wrote that Peters "achieved her definitive stardom" in Sunday in the Park With George and Into the Woods. Sondheim has said of Peters, "Like very few others, she sings and acts at the same time," he says. "Most performers act and then sing, act and then sing ... Bernadette is flawless as far as I'm concerned. I can't think of anything negative." Peters continued her association with Sondheim by appearing in a 1995 benefit concert of Anyone Can Whistle, playing the role of Fay Apple. Additionally, she appeared in several concerts featuring Sondheim's work, and performed at his 1993 Kennedy Center Honors ceremony.

She next starred in the musical adaptation of Neil Simon's The Goodbye Girl with music by Marvin Hamlisch (1993). Peters won her second Tony for Best Leading Actress in a Musical for her performance as Annie Oakley in the 1999 Broadway revival of Annie Get Your Gun. Among many glowing notices, critic Lloyd Rose of The Washington Post commented: "[Peters] banishes all thoughts of Ethel Merman about two bars into her first number, 'Doin' What Comes Natur'lly.' Partly this is because Merman's Annie was a hearty, boisterous gal, while Peters plays an adorable, slightly goofy gamine. ... For anyone who cares about the American musical theater, the chance to see Peters in this role is reason enough to see the show." Playbill went even further: "Arguably the most talented comedienne in the musical theatre today, Peters manages to extract a laugh from most every line she delivers."

In 2003, Peters starred as Mama Rose in the Broadway revival of Gypsy, earning another Tony nomination. Ben Brantley in The New York Times wrote, "Working against type and expectation under the direction of Sam Mendes, Ms. Peters has created the most complex and compelling portrait of her long career, and she has done this in ways that deviate radically from the Merman blueprint." In 2006, she participated in a reading of the Sondheim-Weidman musical Bounce. In 2007, she participated in a charity reading of the play Love Letters, with actor John Dossett. Peters starred in the Broadway revival of Sondheim's A Little Night Music (2010), succeeding Catherine Zeta-Jones in the role. The New York Times reviewer wrote of her performance,

Peters's next stage appearance was in the role of Sally Durant Plummer in the Kennedy Center for the Performing Arts production of the Sondheim–Goldman musical Follies in 2011. One critic wrote: "Peters ... exquisitely captures the character's unfathomable sadness and longing. It's a star turn, for sure, but one that brings attention to itself because of its truthfulness. Not surprisingly, her rendition of 'Losing My Mind' is simply shattering." She reprised the role in the Broadway revival at the Marquis Theatre, later in 2011, and received a nomination for the Drama Desk Award, Outstanding Actress in a Musical.

Peters starred in the Sondheim and Wynton Marsalis staged concert revue titled A Bed and a Chair: A New York Love Affair at New York City Center in 2013. This collaboration between Encores! and Jazz at Lincoln Center was directed by John Doyle, with jazzy arrangements of Sondheim's songs. Peters sang "Broadway Baby", "The Ladies Who Lunch", "Isn't He Something?", "I Remember" and "With So Little to Be Sure Of", among others. Jesse Green, in his review in New York Magazines Vulture site, commented: "[W]hat a wrenching (and funny) actress Peters remains, not on top of her voice but through it." Brantley, in The New York Times wrote: "As a singer and actress, she just can't help being ardent, full-throated and sincere. She also reminds us here of her considerable and original comic gifts."

She returned to Broadway in the title role of the 2017 revival of Hello, Dolly! at the Shubert Theatre. Succeeding Bette Midler, Peters began performances on January 20, 2018. Marilyn Stasio wrote in Variety: "This Dolly's personal style is to twinkle and charm people into getting her way. (Her 'So Long, Dearie' is an irresistible gem.) She also has the acting chops to moisten eyeballs when she entreats her late husband to bless her renouncement of widowhood and rejoin the human race in 'Before the Parade Passes By'." Peters played her final performance as Dolly on July 15, 2018.

Peters has been cast to make her West End debut alongside Lea Salonga in the Stephen Sondheim tribute revue Old Friends, which is scheduled to run at the Gielgud Theatre from September 16, 2023 to January 6, 2024.

Theatre awards
Peters has been nominated for the Tony Award seven times, winning twice, and has also received an honorary Tony Award. She has also been nominated for the Drama Desk Award nine times, winning three times, for Annie Get Your Gun, Song and Dance and Dames at Sea. 

At the 66th Tony Awards in 2012, Peters was presented with the honorary Isabelle Stevenson Award for "making a substantial contribution of volunteered time and effort on behalf of one or more humanitarian, social service or charitable organizations, regardless of whether such organizations relate to the theatre", specifically for her work with Broadway Barks. In making the announcement for this award, the Tony official site noted "With a rich generosity of spirit, Bernadette Peters' devotion to charitable causes is perhaps only outweighed by her much fêted dedication to performing. ... Peters' efforts are held in the highest regard on Broadway and beyond." BC/EFA's Tom Viola said, "Bernadette's boundless compassion and generosity represent the best in all of us."

Television appearances

Peters was nominated for Emmy Awards for her guest starring roles on The Muppet Show (1977), Ally McBeal (2001) and Zoey's Extraordinary Playlist (2021). On The Muppet Show, Peters sang the song "Just One Person" to Robin the Frog.  She was one of the Muppets' guests when they hosted The Tonight Show in 1979, again singing "Just One Person" to Robin, and she appeared in other episodes with the Muppets.  Peters was also nominated for a 2003 Daytime Emmy Award, Outstanding Performer in a Children's Special, for her work in the 2002 television film Bobbie's Girl. She won the 1987 "CableACE Award" for her role as Dot in the television version of Sunday in the Park with George.

She performed and presented at the Academy Awards broadcasts in 1976, 1981, 1983, 1987 and 1994. Peters has been a presenter at the annual Tony Awards ceremony and also co-hosted the ceremony with Gregory Hines in 2002. She also hosted Saturday Night Live in November 1981. Peters has appeared on many TV variety shows, with stars such as Sonny and Cher and George Burns. She made 11 guest appearances on The Carol Burnett Show as well as appearing with Burnett in the made-for-television version of Once Upon a Mattress and the 1982 film Annie. She also performed at the Kennedy Center Honors ceremony for Burnett in 2003. Peters appeared on The Tonight Show Starring Johnny Carson and on the day-time talk show Live with Regis and Kelly, both as a co-host and a guest. Peters voiced Rita the stray cat in the "Rita and Runt" segments of the animated series Animaniacs in the 1990s.  Peters, as Rita, sang both original songs written for the show and parodies of Broadway musical numbers. She appeared on Inside the Actors Studio in November 2000, discussing her career and craft.

Peters has also appeared in such television films as The Last Best Year (1990), Cinderella (1997; receiving a nomination for the "Golden Satellite Award" for her role), and Prince Charming (2003). She co-starred in her own television series, All's Fair, with Richard Crenna in 1976–77. She played a young, liberal photographer, who becomes romantically involved with an older, conservative columnist. Although Peters was praised for her charismatic performance, the show ran for only one season.  Peters was nominated for a Golden Globe award as Best TV Actress – Musical/Comedy.  In March 2005, she made a pilot for an ABC situation comedy series titled Adopted, co-starring with Christine Baranski, but it was not picked up. Peters appeared in the Lifetime television film Living Proof, which was first broadcast on October 18, 2008. She played the role of Barbara, an art teacher with breast cancer, who is initially reluctant to participate in the study for the cancer drug Herceptin. Andrew Gans of Playbill wrote, "Peters is able to choose from an expansive emotional palette to color the character, and her performance... is moving, humorous and ultimately spirit-raising".

Peters's television work also includes guest appearances on several television series. She appeared as the sharp-tongued sister of Karen Walker (Megan Mullally) on the penultimate episode of the NBC series Will & Grace, "Whatever Happened to Baby Gin?" (May 2006); as a defense attorney on the NBC series, Law & Order: Special Victims Unit (November 2006); as a judge on the ABC series Boston Legal (May 2007); and as an accident victim in Grey's Anatomy (September 2008). Of her role in Grey's Anatomy, TV Guide wrote: "Peters is especially fine as she confronts a life spinning out of control. I'd make her an early contender for a guest-actor Emmy nomination." In January, February and May 2009, she appeared in the ABC series Ugly Betty in five episodes as Jodie Papadakis, a magazine mogul running the YETI (Young Editors Training Initiative) program that Betty and Marc are in. Her appearance at the Adelaide Cabaret Festival in June 2009 was filmed and broadcast in Australia later that month.

Peters first appeared in the NBC series Smash in the March 2012 episode "The Workshop", as Leigh Conroy, Ivy's mother, a retired Broadway star, who feels competitive because of her daughter's blossoming career.  She visits the workshop and sings Everything's Coming Up Roses (from Gypsy) at the urging of the workshop cast. She also appeared in the season 1 finale, "Bombshell" (May 2012), to celebrate Ivy's presumed role as Marilyn, in "The Parents" episode (April 2013), where, as Leigh, she sings an original Marc Shaiman and Scott Wittman song, "Hang the Moon", and in the episodes "Opening Night" (April 2013) and "The Phenomenon" (May 2013).

From 2014 to 2018, Peters played Gloria Windsor, the chairwoman of the orchestra board in Mozart in the Jungle, a web video series by Amazon Studios based on Blair Tindall's memoir of the same name. The show was picked up for a second and third season. She was a guest star in the 2014 Bravo television series Girlfriends' Guide to Divorce in the episode "Rule #21: Leave Childishness to Children". Peters played the recurring role of Lenore Rindell, a financial scammer, in the CBS television series The Good Fight, in 2017 and 2018. In 2020, she played Ms. Freesia in the series Katy Keene. She next played Deb in Zoey's Extraordinary Playlist (2020–2021) and the television film Zoey's Extraordinary Christmas (2021).

Recordings

Peters has recorded six solo albums and several singles. Three of her albums have been nominated for the Grammy Award. Peters's 1980 single "Gee Whiz", remaking Carla Thomas' 1960 Memphis soul hit, reached the top forty on the U.S. Billboard pop singles charts. She has recorded most of the Broadway and off-Broadway musicals she has appeared in, and four of these cast albums have won Grammy Awards.

Peters's debut album in 1980 (an LP), titled Bernadette Peters contained 10 songs, including "If You Were the Only Boy", "Gee Whiz" (a Top 40 hit single), "Heartquake", "Should've Never Let Him Go", "Chico's Girl", "Pearl's a Singer", "Other Lady", "Only Wounded", "I Never Thought I'd Break" and "You'll Never Know". The original cover painting by Alberto Vargas was one of his last works, created at the age of 84. According to The New York Daily News, Peters "persuaded him to do one last 'Vargas Girls' portrait...  She just went to his California retreat, asked him to do one more, he looked at her and said, 'You ARE a Vargas girl!'"  She kept the original painting. The original title planned for the album was Decades. Rolling Stone wrote of her debut album:

Her next solo album, Now Playing (1981), featured songs by Jerry Leiber and Mike Stoller, Carole Bayer Sager and Marvin Hamlisch, and Stephen Sondheim (for example, "Broadway Baby"). Bernadette Peters was re-released on CD in 1992 as Bernadette, with the 1980 Vargas cover art, and included some of the songs from Now Playing. In 1996, she was nominated for a Grammy Award for her best-selling album, I'll Be Your Baby Tonight, which includes popular songs by John Lennon, Paul McCartney, Lyle Lovett, Hank Williams, Sam Cooke and Billy Joel, as well as Broadway classics by Leonard Bernstein and Rodgers and Hammerstein. The live recording of her 1996 Carnegie Hall concert, Sondheim, Etc. – Bernadette Peters Live At Carnegie Hall, also was nominated for a Grammy Award.

Peters's next studio album, in 2002, Bernadette Peters Loves Rodgers and Hammerstein, consisted entirely of Rodgers and Hammerstein songs, including two that she often sings in her concerts, "Some Enchanted Evening" and "There Is Nothin' Like a Dame". This album, which reached position 14 on the Billboard "Top Internet Albums" chart, was her third album in a row nominated for a Grammy Award. It formed the basis of her Radio City Music Hall solo concert debut in June 2002. Her last solo album, titled Sondheim Etc., Etc. Live At Carnegie Hall: The Rest of It, was released in 2005. It consists of all of the songs (and patter) from her 1996 Carnegie Hall concert that were not included in the earlier recording. Additionally, Peters has recorded songs on other albums, such as "Dublin Lady" on John Whelan's Flirting with the Edge (Narada, 1998). On the Mandy Patinkin Dress Casual 1990 album, Patinkin and Peters recorded the songs from Stephen Sondheim's 1966 television play, Evening Primrose. On the tribute album Born to the Breed: A Tribute to Judy Collins Peters sings "Trust Your Heart".

In The New York Times review of the 1986 Broadway cast recording of Song and Dance (titled Bernadette Peters in Andrew Lloyd Webber's 'Song & Dance'''), Stephen Holden opined the recording was:

In 2003, Andrew Gans wrote in Playbill.com of Peters's recording sessions for Gypsy: "What is it about her voice that is so moving? Part womanly and part girlish, it is a powerful instrument, not only in volume (though that is impressive) but in the wealth of emotion it is able to convey. ... her voice – that mix of husky, sweet, rounded, vibrato-filled tones – induces a response that spans the emotional scale." Of her "Rose's Turn", Gans wrote: "...her rendition of this song may be the highlight of a career already filled with many highlights: She has taken a song that has been delivered incredibly by others and brought it to a new level." Of her performance on the recording of Follies (2011), Steven Suskin wrote in Playbill.com: "This is a fine Sally, the sort of Sally you'd expect to get from an actress like – well, Bernadette Peters. The performance on the CD is compelling; either this is simply the magic of the recording studio or Peters has changed what she does and how she does it."

Concert performances

Peters has been performing her solo concert in the United States and Canada for many years. She made her solo concert debut at Carnegie Hall in New York City in 1996, devoting the second half to the work of Stephen Sondheim.Holden, Stephen. "Bernadette Peters, Sweet With Sondheim". The New York Times, December 11, 1996. Retrieved February 19, 2008 She performed a similar concert in London, which was taped and released on video, and also aired on U.S. Public Television stations in 1999. She continues to perform her solo concert at venues around the U.S., such as the Adrienne Arsht Center for the Performing Arts in Miami, and with symphony orchestras such as the Pittsburgh Symphony Orchestra, the Dallas Symphony, and the Los Angeles Philharmonic at Walt Disney Hall.

In a review of her 2002 Radio City Music Hall concert, Stephen Holden of The New York Times described Peters as "the peaches-and-cream embodiment of an ageless storybook princess... inside a giant soap bubble floating toward heaven. A belief in the power of the dreams behind Rodgers and Hammerstein's songs, if not in their reality, was possible." Peters made her solo concert debut at Lincoln Center in New York City in 2006. Holden, reviewing this concert, noted, "Even while swiveling across the stage of Avery Fisher Hall like a voluptuous Botticelli Venus in Bob Mackie spangles... she radiated a preternatural innocence.... For the eternal child in all of us, she evokes a surrogate childhood playmate". Peters was the headliner at the 2009 Adelaide Cabaret Festival in Adelaide, Australia. The Sunday Mail wrote that Peters showed "the verve, vigour and voice of someone half her age."

Peters's concert performances often benefit arts organizations or help them to mark special occasions, such as her performance on an overnight cruise on the Seabourn Odyssey in a benefit for the Adrienne Arsht Center for the Performing Arts in Miami in 2009. She was one of the performers to help celebrate the center's grand opening in 2006. She headlined The Alliance of The Arts Black Tie Anniversary Gala at Thousand Oaks Civic Arts Plaza in Thousand Oaks, California, on November 21, 2009. She had helped to celebrate the opening of the Arts Plaza with concerts fifteen years earlier.Simon, Stephanie. "Star to Perform at Plaza Opening Thousand Oaks: Publicist says Bernadette Peters intends to give a solo show at the 1,800-seat auditorium". Los Angeles Times, March 5, 1994 In 2015, Peters performed in the concert Sinatra: Voice for a Century at Lincoln Center, a fundraiser for the new David Geffen Hall in celebration of Frank Sinatra's 100th birthday. She sang "It Never Entered My Mind". It was hosted by Seth MacFarlane and featured the New York Philharmonic Orchestra, Sting, Billy Porter, Sutton Foster and Fantasia Barrino. PBS plans to broadcast it as part of its "Live from Lincoln Center" series in December 2015.Holden, Stephen. "Review: Stars Pay Tribute to Frank Sinatra", The New York Times, December 4, 2015; and Gordon, Amanda. "Seth MacFarlane Does Sinatra as Rosenstein Names Favorite Song", Bloomberg, December 4, 2015

Since 2013, she has been touring intermittently with her cabaret act, An Evening with Bernadette Peters, and a concert series, "Bernadette Peters in Concert". In April 2014 she gave concert performances in Australia. The reviewer for The Sydney Morning Herald wrote: "Perhaps it is a matter of personality as much as voice: a natural warmth and an instinct for never exaggerating the emotional content of a song. Whatever the case, it is easy to see and hear why, for 30 years, Bernadette Peters has probably been musical theatre's finest performer. ... She even breathed new life into 'Send In the Clowns'. ... Rather than make it emotionally swollen (as so many do), Peters contracted it, delicately squeezing out its essence like toothpaste from a near-empty tube." She gave concerts in June 2016 in the UK at the Royal Festival Hall, Manchester Opera House and Edinburgh Playhouse.Shenton, Mark. "Bernadette Peters in Concert review at Royal Festival Hall, London – 'Broadway royalty'", thestage.co.uk, June 3, 2016 In 2022 she participated in Stephen Sondheim's Old Friends, a Cameron Mackintosh-produced tribute concert, May 3, 2022 at the Sondheim Theatre, London.

Children's books

Peters sings four songs on the CD accompanying a 2005 children's picture book Dewey Doo-it Helps Owlie Fly Again, the proceeds of which benefit the Christopher Reeve Foundation. Her co-star from Sunday in the Park with George, Mandy Patinkin, also sings on the CD.Gans, Andrew. "Peters and Patinkin to Make In-Store Appearance at NYC Barnes and Noble", Playbill, June 7, 2005. Retrieved November 4, 2016

To support Broadway Barks, the animal adoption charity that she co-founded with Mary Tyler Moore, Peters has written three children's books, illustrated by Liz Murphy. The first is about a scrappy dog, named after her dog Kramer, and the pleasure of adopting a pet. Titled Broadway Barks, the book is published by Blue Apple Books (2008). Peters wrote the words and music to a lullaby, titled "Kramer's Song", which is included on a CD in the book. The book reached #5 on The New York Times Children's Best Sellers: Picture Books list for the week of June 8, 2008.

Her second children's book is the story of a pit bull, named after Peters's dog Stella. The character would rather be a pig ballerina, but she learns to accept herself. Titled Stella is a Star, the book includes a CD with an original song written and performed by Peters and was released in April 2010 by Blue Apple Books.  According to Publishers Weekly, "Turning the pages to Peters' spirited narration, which is provided in an accompanying CD, makes for a more rewarding reading experience. The story and disc end with a sneakily affecting self-esteem anthem, which, like the familiar tale itself, is buoyed by the author's lovely vocals." Peters introduced the book at a reading and signing where she also sang part of the song, at the Los Angeles Times Festival of Books, Los Angeles, California, on April 24, 2010.

The third book, released in 2015,  titled Stella and Charlie Friends Forever, is about her rescue dog Charlie joining her household, and how Charlie got along with her older dog, Stella.Peters, Bernadette. Stella and Charlie Friends Forever, Blue Apple Books (2015) 

Other activities
Broadway Barks

In 1999, Peters and Mary Tyler Moore co-founded Broadway Barks, an annual animal adopt-a-thon. Each July, Peters hosts the Broadway Barks event in New York City.Gans, Andrew. "Broadway Barks for a Good Cause Today in Shubert Alley", Playbill, July 30, 2016 Peters held a concert, "A Special Concert for Broadway Barks Because Broadway Cares", at the Minskoff Theatre, New York City, on November 9, 2009, as a benefit for both Broadway Barks and Broadway Cares/Equity Fights AIDS. The concert raised an estimated $615,000 for the two charities. Also in support of Broadway Barks, Peters has appeared on the daytime talk show Live With Regis and Kelly.Gans, Andrew. "Peters to Promote Broadway Barks 9! on Several Morning Shows", Playbill, July 3, 2007. Retrieved November 22, 2016

In 2018, Peters received the Brooke Astor Award from the Animal Medical Center for her lifelong commitment to animal welfare, including the "over 2,000 adoptions" to date at Broadway Barks events. In 2022, Broadway Barks held in its first in-person animal adoption event since the COVID-19 pandemic began, with many Broadway stars in attendance and many shelter organizations participating. Activists protesting against the Humane Society of New York, one of the shelter organizations represented at the event, briefly interrupted Peters's speech there.

Other
Peters serves on the board of trustees of Broadway Cares/Equity Fights AIDS and participates in that organization's events, such as the annual Broadway Flea Market and Grand Auction, and the "Gypsy of the Year" competition. She is also a member of the Board of Directors of Standing Tall, a non-profit educational program offering an innovative program for children with multiple disabilities, based in New York City. Her late husband was the Director and Treasurer of Standing Tall. The 1995 benefit concert Anyone Can Whistle and Peters's "Carnegie Hall" 1996 concert were benefits for the Gay Men's Health Crisis.

In 2007, Peters helped the Broadway community celebrate the end of the stagehand strike in a "Broadway's Back" concert at the Marquis Theatre. In 2008, she was one of the participants in a fund-raiser for the Westport Country Playhouse, and in the opening ceremony and dedication of the renovated TKTS discount ticket booth in Times Square. That year, she also presented New York City Mayor Michael Bloomberg with the Humanitarian Award at the Breast Cancer Research Foundation awards. On March 8, 2009, she helped celebrate the last birthday of Senator Ted Kennedy (singing "There Is Nothin' Like a Dame") in a private concert and ceremony held at the Kennedy Center, hosted by Bill Cosby, with many senators, representatives, and President Barack and First Lady Michelle Obama in attendance. On November 19, 2009, she helped to celebrate the opening of The David Rubenstein Atrium at Lincoln Center.

On February 8, 2010, Peters was one of the many to honor Angela Lansbury at the annual Drama League of New York benefit, singing "Not While I'm Around".Lenzi, Linda. "Photo Coverage: Drama League Honors Angela Lansbury" BroadwayWorld.com, February 9, 2010. Retrieved November 22, 2016 In March 2010, Peters helped Stephen Sondheim celebrate his 80th birthday in the Roundabout Theatre Company "Sondheim 80" benefit. She was one of the Honorary Chairs.Jones, Kenneth. "Everybody Rise! Roundabout's Sondheim 80 Celebrates a Master's Milestone", Playbill, March 22, 2010. Retrieved November 1, 2016 She had been part of the Roundabout Theatre's Sondheim gala for his 75th birthday. In 2012, Peters became a Patron of The Stephen Sondheim Society. She performed at the Olivier Awards ceremony in 2014, singing the song "Losing My Mind". A review in The Arts Desk read: "The tradition of bringing over a Broadway baby or two ... presumably explained a late appearance by a still-luminous Bernadette Peters, who reached the very high note at the end of 'Losing My Mind' often not attempted by interpreters of that particular Sondheim song."Brown, Mark."Olivier awards 2014: Almeida theatre defeats West End giants", The Guardian, April 13, 2014

Personal life
Peters and Steve Martin began a romantic relationship in 1977 that lasted approximately four years.Fong-Torres, Ben. "Steve Martin Sings: The Rolling Stone Interview", Rolling Stone Magazine, February 18, 1982, pp. 10–13 By 1981, her popularity led to her appearing on the cover and in a spread in the December 1981 issue of Playboy Magazine, in which she posed in lingerie designed by Bob Mackie.

Peters married investment adviser Michael Wittenberg on July 20, 1996, at the Millbrook, New York, home of long-time friend Mary Tyler Moore. Wittenberg died at age 43 on September 26, 2005, in a helicopter crash in Montenegro while on a business trip."M. Wittenberg, 43; husband to Bernadette Peters", The Boston Globe, September 29, 2005. Retrieved July 3, 2008

Peters has a mixed-breed dog named Charlie. She has adopted all of her dogs from shelters.

Honorary awards
Peters has received many honorary awards, including a star on the Hollywood Walk of Fame in 1987. She was named the Hasty Pudding Woman of the Year in 1987. Other honors include the Sarah Siddons Award for outstanding performance in a Chicago theatrical production (1994 for The Goodbye Girl); the American Theatre Hall of Fame at the Gershwin Theatre in New York City (1996), as the youngest person so honored; The Actors' Fund Artistic Achievement Medal (1999); an honorary doctorate from Hofstra University (2002); the Hollywood Bowl Hall of Fame in 2002 and the National Dance Institute 2009 Artistic Honoree. She was the recipient of the Sondheim Award, presented by the Signature Theatre in 2011.

In 2012, New Dramatists, an organization that supports beginning playwrights, presented Peters with their Lifetime Achievement Award, stating: "She has brought a new sound into the theatre and continues to do so, in surprising and miraculous ways. By some sleight of magic, her singularity always manages to bring out the best and richest in the work of her composers and writers." In 2013 the Drama League gave Peters its Special Award of Distinguished Achievement in Musical Theatre Award for "her contribution to the musical theatre." Peters was the Centennial Honoree at the Drama League Centennial Gala in 2015. A musical tribute was presented by many of Peters's costars over the years, including the original and current casts of Dames at Sea. The League said that Peters "exemplifies the absolute best of what American musical theater can be."

She received the 2016 John Willis Award for Lifetime Achievement in the Theatre, presented at the Theatre World Awards on May 23, 2016.Sullivan, Lindsey. "Bernadette Peters, Austin P. McKenzie & More Honored at 2016 Theatre World Awards" Broadway.com, May 24, 2016 She was the honoree at the Manhattan Theatre Club 2018 Fall Benefit in November 2018. She is the 2019 recipient of the Prince Rainier III Award "for her outstanding artistry and exemplary philanthropic give-back."

Acting credits

Awards and nominations
Theatre

Music

Film

Television

Notes

References
Bryer, Jackson R. and Richard Allan Davison.  The Art Of The American Musical: Conversations with the Creators (2005), Rutgers University Press, 
Crespy, David Allison.  Off-Off-Broadway Explosion (2003), Back Stage Books, 
Knapp, Raymond.  The American Musical and the Performance of Personal Identity'' (2006), Princeton University Press,

External links

 
 
 
 
 
 Standing Tall website
 The Carol Burnett Show screengrabs, "As the Stomach Turns" episode
 Photo of Peters on Bing Crosby Christmas special
 Numerous photos of Peters, fan website

1948 births
Living people
20th-century American actresses
21st-century American actresses
Actresses from New York City
American child actresses
American child singers
American women singers
American film actresses
American sopranos
American musical theatre actresses
American people of Italian descent
American stage actresses
American television actresses
American voice actresses
Angel Records artists
Audiobook narrators
Best Musical or Comedy Actress Golden Globe (film) winners
Drama Desk Award winners
People from Ozone Park, Queens
Tony Award winners